The Dreams Our Stuff Is Made Of: How Science Fiction Conquered the World (1998) is an overview of the interactions between science fiction and the real world, written by Thomas M. Disch, an American author in the field. It is neither a history of science fiction nor a collection of personal anecdotes, but contains some of each, and is written in somewhat conversational style, designed to appeal to both a relative newcomer to science fiction and an expert in the field.

In this book Disch makes several arguments: That America is a nation of liars, and for that reason science fiction has a special claim to be our national literature, as the art form best adapted to telling the lies we like to hear and to pretend we believe. That Edgar Allan Poe was the first SF author (as opposed to authors such as Mary Shelley or Cyrano de Bergerac). And that the three greatest SF authors are Poe, Jules Verne and H. G. Wells. He levels attacks against writers who in his opinion have attempted to trick or manipulate readers by presenting science fiction as fact—namely Erich von Däniken and L. Ron Hubbard—and examines the use of science fiction to promote a political ideology, singling out Ursula K. Le Guin's feminism, and Robert A. Heinlein for advocating the growth of the military–industrial complex.

The book also examines the manner in which the real world is represented in science fiction allegory, such as the argument that the aliens of Star Trek represent non-Caucasian humans, and that science fiction provides an insight into the strategies of the American military.

The Dreams Our Stuff Is Made Of was awarded the 1999 Hugo Award for best related book.

Popular culture books
1998 books
Works by Thomas M. Disch
Hugo Award for Best Related Book winning works